The Savings Deposit Insurance Fund of Turkey, a.k.a. TMSF in abbreviated form, is the governing body concerned with matters of fund management and insurance in the Turkish banking system.

The body was founded in 1933 with the name Deposit Protection Act. In 1960, the name was changed to Bankalar Tasfiye Fonu. The current name was adopted in 1983.

TMSF is also involved in the media industry, and owns at least one asset each for every newspaper, pay television, television and radio station. In 2013, TMSF acquired some assets from Çukurova Media Group after the company was forced to sell due to tax debts.

The institution was initially overseen by the Central Bank of Turkey, however, it later became attached to the Prime Minister's office, and later, to the President's office.

References

External links
Official website

Banking in Turkey
Deposit insurance
Organizations based in Istanbul
Organizations established in 1983
Government agencies of Turkey
1983 establishments in Turkey
Insurance in Turkey